Bylgjan (The Wave) is an Icelandic radio station, run by the media company Sýn. Launched in 1986, it was the first privately owned radio station in Iceland. Bylgjan is broadcast throughout the country from a network of FM transmitters (98.9 MHz is the channel's main frequency in Reykjavík) and also streamed on the internet.

References

See also
 Stöð 2
 Fréttablaðið

Radio stations in Iceland
Radio stations established in 1986